The women's 50m butterfly events at the 2022 World Para Swimming Championships were held at the Penteada Olympic Swimming Complex in Madeira between 12–18 June.

Medalists

Results

S5
Heats
13 swimmers from nine nations took part. The swimmers with the top eight times, regardless of heat, advanced to the final.

Final
The final was held on 14 June 2022.

S6

S7

References

2022 World Para Swimming Championships
2022 in women's swimming